Mariëtte Iris Hamer (born 7 June 1958) is a Dutch politician and trade union leader serving as commissioner for combating inappropriate behavior and sexual violence since 2022. A member of the Labour Party (PvdA), she was its leader in the House of Representatives from 2008 to 2010.

Education and private career
A native of Amsterdam, Hamer studied linguistics at the University of Amsterdam. She is a co-founder and was chairwoman of the Dutch Student Union (LSVb); she later worked as an educator and at the Ministry of Education, Culture and Science.

Political career

House of Representatives

Hamer served as a member of the House of Representatives from 19 May 1998 and 10 September 2014. From 22 January 2008 to 17 June 2010 she was parliamentary leader; she was succeeded by former Amsterdam Mayor and party leader Job Cohen, who had just been elected to the House of Representatives. She focused on matters of labour economics, day care and emancipation. In the past she also focused on matters of education, social affairs. Hamer also was party chair in an interim capacity from 5 September 2000 until 16 March 2001.

Social and Economic Council
Since 10 September 2014 Hamer has been a Crown-appointed member and Chairwoman of the Social and Economic Council (SER). She was nominated to the position by Lodewijk Asscher, Minister of Social Affairs and Employment; King Willem-Alexander of the Netherlands validated the appointment. She succeeded Wiebe Draijer, who resigned from office following his appointment as CEO of the Rabobank. In the House of Representatives Hamer was succeeded by Henk Leenders.

In 2022, Hamer was appointed by the government of Prime Minister Mark Rutte as commissioner for combating inappropriate behavior and sexual violence, a new role in which she is tasked with coming up with a plan to tackle sexually inappropriate behavior and sexual violence.

References

External links

Official
  Drs. M.I. (Mariëtte) Hamer Parlement & Politiek

 

1958 births
Living people
Chairmen of the Labour Party (Netherlands)
Chairmen of the Social and Economic Council
Trade unionists from Amsterdam
Dutch trade union leaders
Dutch women activists
Dutch activists
Labour Party (Netherlands) politicians
Linguists from the Netherlands
Members of the House of Representatives (Netherlands)
Members of the Social and Economic Council
Politicians from Amsterdam
People from Maassluis
Dutch socialist feminists
University of Amsterdam alumni
20th-century Dutch women politicians
20th-century Dutch politicians
21st-century Dutch women politicians
21st-century Dutch politicians